An Estonian passport is an international travel document issued to citizens of Estonia, and may also serve as proof of Estonian citizenship. Besides enabling the bearer to travel internationally and serving as indication of Estonian citizenship, the passport facilitates the process of securing assistance from Estonian consular officials abroad or other European Union member states in case an Estonian consular is absent, if needed. If an Estonian citizen wishes to receive an identity document, especially an Estonian passport, somewhere other than the foreign representation of the Republic of Estonia, then the bearer of the Estonian citizenship staying abroad could receive the travel documents in embassies of any EU country worldwide by paying 50 Euro. Many countries require passport validity of no less than 6 months and one or two blank pages.

Every Estonian citizen is also a citizen of the European Union. The passport, along with the national identity card allows for free rights of movement and residence in any of the states of the European Union, European Economic Area and Switzerland.

An Estonian certificate of return shall be issued to an Estonian citizen staying in a foreign state whose Estonian passport becomes unusable or is destroyed or lost. An Estonian certificate of return shall be issued on the basis of a birth certificate to a child of less than one year of age who was born to a citizen of Estonia in a foreign state. An Estonian certificate of return may be issued to an Estonian citizen who has no valid Estonian document if the issue of such document is in the public interest. An Estonian certificate of return shall be issued with a period of validity of up to twelve months. Upon entry into Estonia, a certificate of return shall be returned to the Police and Border Guard Board who shall forward the certificate to the Ministry of Foreign Affairs.

A return support can be applied by ethnic Estonians and Estonian citizens who have lived outside Estonia for 10 years or more or were born in a foreign country. A return support will be paid to those who need help, if they want to settle in Estonia.

History
Estonian passports were issued throughout the country's occupation by the Estonian consulate in New York. Passports were again issued in Estonia in 1991, shortly after the country regained its independence from the Soviet Union. A machine-readable passport type was introduced on 1 February 2002.

Application
The Police and Border Guard Board in Estonia and by Estonian foreign representations abroad are responsible for the issuing and renewing of Estonian passports.

Physical appearance

In conformity with the standard European Union design, Estonian passports are burgundy, with the Estonian Coat of arms emblazoned in the centre of the front cover. The words  "EUROOPA LIIT" (European Union) and "EESTI" (Estonia) are inscribed above the coat of arms and the word "PASS" (Passport) is inscribed below the coat of arms. Estonian passports have the standard biometric symbol at the bottom.

Identity information page

The biodata page of an Estonian passport includes the following information:

 Photo of the passport holder
 Type (P for ordinary passports)
 Code of Issuing State (EST)
 Passport number
 1 Surname
 2 Given Names
 3 Citizenship (Eesti/Est)
 4 Date of Birth
 5 Personal Identification No.
 6 Sex
 7 Place of Birth
 8 Date of Issue
 9 Authority
 10 Date of Expiry
 11 Holder's Signature

The information page ends with the Machine Readable Zone starting with P<EST.

Passport note
Estonian passports issued between February 2002 and May 2007 contain a note from the issuing state that is addressed to the authorities of all other states, identifying the bearer as a citizen of that state and requesting that he or she be allowed to pass and be treated according to international norms. The note inside Estonian passports states:

The holder of this passport is under the protection of the Republic of Estonia. The Government of the Republic of Estonia hereby requests all civil and military authorities to permit the holder of this passport to pass freely without let or hindrance and in case of need to give all lawful aid and protection.

Languages
The data page/information page is printed in Estonian, English and French.

Visa requirements

Visa requirements for Estonian citizens are administrative entry restrictions by the authorities of other states placed on citizens of Estonia. 
As of 31 December 2021, Estonian citizens can visit 181
countries without a visa or with a visa granted on arrival, ranking the Estonian passport 12th in the world in terms of travel freedom according to the Henley Passport Index. Estonian citizens can live and work in any country within the EU as a result of the right of free movement and residence granted in Article 21 of the EU Treaty.

Visa requirements for holders of Estonian alien's passport (for residents of Estonia who are either stateless or have undefined citizenship) are different.

Passport types

For Estonian citizens, apart from ordinary passports, diplomatic and service passports are also issued for those who qualify for possession of such documents.

Biometric passports
Gemalto won the contract to supply biometric passports for the Citizenship and Migration Board, delivering the first new passports in early 2007.

Possession of a biometric passport is a pre-requisite for Estonians who want to qualify for the Visa Waiver Program for travel to the United States by registering via the Electronic System for Travel Authorization.

Starting from June 2009, all applicants for an Estonian passport are required to provide their fingerprints to be stored on the biometric chip in their passports.

See also
Estonian identity card
Estonian seafarer's discharge book
Estonian temporary travel document
Estonian alien's passport
Estonian travel document for refugees
E-residency of Estonia is a concept independent of nationality giving non-Estonian residents access to Estonian financial services.
Estonian nationality law
Visa requirements for Estonian citizens
Visa requirements for Estonian non-citizens
Passports of the European Union
 List of passports

References and notes

External links
 Information about Estonian citizen’s passport by Estonian Police and Border Guard Board
 Information about Estonian citizen’s passport by Prado Consilium
 Sample passport of an Estonian citizen, issued by Estonian Police and Border Guard Board starting from 01.06.2014
 Certificate of Return for Estonian citizen
 Identity Documents Act
 Visa-Free Country List by Estonian Foreign Ministry
 Passport Index Visa-Free Score Estonian Passport
 Henley & Partners Visa Restrictions Index Map
 Estonian Representations around the World
 A map of Estonian representations abroad

Passports by country
Government of Estonia
European Union passports